Raven Klaasen and Rajeev Ram were the defending champions, but Klaasen chose not to participate this year and Ram chose to compete in Shenzhen instead. 

Jonathan Erlich and Aisam-ul-Haq Qureshi won the title, defeating Marcus Daniell and Marcelo Demoliner in the final, 6–3, 7–6(7–3).

Seeds

Draw

Draw

References
 Main Draw

Chengdu Open - Doubles
2017 Doubles